Kani Hoseynbag (also Romanized as Kānī Ḩoseynbag; also known as Ḩoseynābād, Husainabad, Kānī, Kānī Ḩoseyn Bak, Kānī Ḩoseyn Beg, Kānī Ḩoseyn Beyg, Kānī-ye Ḩoseyn Beyg, and Khāneh Husain Beg) is a village in Zherizhah Rural District, in the Central District of Sarvabad County, Kurdistan Province, Iran. At the 2006 census, its population was 245, in 53 families. The village is populated by Kurds.

References 

Towns and villages in Sarvabad County
Kurdish settlements in Kurdistan Province